Mohit Malhotra is an Indian television actor. known for his participation in Splitsvilla 2 and his portrayal of Kartik Sharma in Bade Achhe Lagte Hain and Sid in Sasural Genda Phool. He made his film debut through Vikram Bhatt's psychological thriller Hacked.

Career
Malhotra started his career as Truck Driver with MTV's Splitsvilla 2 and appeared as Spot Boy in Mitwa Phool Kamal Ke as Birju.

In 2010, he appeared in Sasural Genda Phool as a Pimp. In 2011, he was cast in Bade Achhe Lagte Hain as Butler. In 2012, Malhotra played Vihaan in Kya Hua Tera Vaada and Ayaz in Gumrah: End of Innocence.

In 2013, he was ghosted in India's Dancing Superstar. He was also a part of Bindass' Mentals. In 2014, he was outplayed in anthology series Yeh Hai Aashiqui. Next, he portrayed Zubair Qureshi in Colors TV's Beintehaa.

In 2015, Malhotra played Doonga in Zee TV'''s Jamai Raja. In 2017, he played Tesu in &TV's Chupke Chupke. In 2018, he was seen as Khurram in &TV's anthology horror series Laal Ishq.From 2018 to 2019, he portrayed Basant in &TV's Daayan.
In 2020, he made his film debut in Vikram Bhatt's psychological thriller Hacked, opposite Hina Khan. In 2020, Mohit started his production house "Roots Entertainment" and music label "Roots Music' and also worked in Naagin 5'' as Adi Naag Hirday alongside Hina Khan.

Filmography

Television

Films

Music videos

References

External links

 Official Website

Living people
People from Delhi
Indian male television actors
Indian male models
1986 births